Port Credit may refer to:

 Port Credit, Ontario, a community in the city of Mississauga, Ontario, Canada
 Port Credit GO Station, a station in the GO Transit network located in the community
 Port Credit Secondary School, in the Canadian community